Muilheh or Moveylheh, also rendered as Molheh, may refer to:
 Muilheh-ye Olya
 Muilheh-ye Sofla
 Muilheh-ye Vosta